Zdory  (German: Sdorren, 1938-1945: Dorren) is a village in the administrative district of Gmina Pisz, within Pisz County, Warmian-Masurian Voivodeship, in northern Poland.

References

Zdory